Heirloom may refer to:

Heirloom, an item passed down through generations
Heirloom plant, a cultivar grown during earlier periods of human history
Heirloom tomato, an heirloom cultivar of tomato
Heirloom (TV series), the Anglia Television series
The Heirloom, a 2005 Taiwan ghost movie
"Heirloom", a song from the album Before the Calm by Witness, 1999
"Heirloom", a song from the album Vespertine by Björk, 2001
"Heirloom", a song from the EP All Delighted People by Sufjan Stevens, 2010
"Heirloom", a song from the album Clouds by Apollo Brown, 2011
"Heirloom", a song from the album The Slideshow Effect by Memoryhouse, 2012
"Heirloom", a song from the album The End, So Far by Slipknot, 2022
The Heirloom Project, a collection of traditional Unix software adapted to modern standards